Al-Tarmiya Sport Club, is an Iraqi football team based in Al-Tarmiya, Baghdad, that plays in the Iraq Division Three.

Managerial history
 Ahmed Dareb
 Khalil Lateef Abbas
 Ibrahim Abid
 Mohammed Jassim  
 Ammar Mudhaffar  
 Hashim Mohammed

See also
 2016–17 Iraq FA Cup

References

External links
 Al-Tarmiya SC on Goalzz.com
 Iraq Clubs- Foundation Dates

1992 establishments in Iraq
Association football clubs established in 1992
Football clubs in Baghdad